"Sus Huellas" ("Her Prints") is a song written and performed by American bachata singer Romeo Santos. It is the first single for his fifth studio album Formula, Vol. 3 (2022). It was released on Valentine's Day of 2022. This song contains metaphorical lyrics. It describes a person who is trying to forget a love from their past.

Charts

Certifications

See also
List of Billboard Hot Latin Songs and Latin Airplay number ones of 2022
List of Billboard Tropical Airplay number ones of 2022

References 

2022 singles
2022 songs
Bachata songs
Romeo Santos songs
Songs written by Romeo Santos
Spanish-language songs
Sony Music Latin singles